The term macrocytic is from Greek words meaning "large cell". A macrocytic class of anemia is an anemia (defined as blood with an insufficient concentration of hemoglobin) in which the red blood cells (erythrocytes) are larger than their normal volume. The normal erythrocyte volume in humans is about 80 to 100 femtoliters (fL= 10−15 L). In metric terms the size is given in equivalent cubic micrometers (1 μm3 = 1 fL). The condition of having erythrocytes which (on average) are too large, is called macrocytosis. In contrast, in microcytic anemia, the erythrocytes are smaller than normal.

In a macrocytic anemia, the larger red cells are always associated with insufficient numbers of cells and often also insufficient hemoglobin content per cell. Both of these factors work to the opposite effect of larger cell size, to finally result in a total blood hemoglobin concentration that is less than normal (i.e., anemia).

Macrocytic anemia is not a disease in the sense of having a single pathology but, rather, is a condition. As such, it is the class name for a set of pathologies that all produce somewhat the same red blood cell abnormality. Different pathologies result in macrocytic-type anemias. Some of these pathologies produce slightly different sets of appearances in blood cells that are detectable from red and white cell morphology, and others are only detectable with chemical testing.

Causes

Megaloblastic anemias
Megaloblastic anemias represent a type of macrocytic anemia characterized by certain morphologic abnormalities noted on a peripheral blood smear examination. These abnormalities include the presence of enlarged oval shaped red blood cells (macroovalocytes) and hypersegmented neutrophils (defined as a neutrophil with six or more lobes). Hypersegmented neutrophils may be seen in the absence of macroovalocytes as hypersegmentation of neutrophils is an early sign of megaloblastic anemia and may precede the appearance of macroovalocytes; they may also be seen in other anemias (e.g., iron deficiency anemia) and thus are suggestive of megaloblastic anemia but not specific for it. An increased red cell distribution width (anisocytosis) also suggests megaloblastosis and is commonly seen in Vitamin B12 deficiency and folic acid deficiency. This type of anemia is caused by impaired DNA synthesis and repair, often from deficient thymidine production. Thiamine responsive megaloblastic anemia syndrome also causes megaloblastic anemia.

The red blood cells grow larger because they cannot produce DNA quickly enough to divide at the right time as they grow and thus grow too large before division. Additional causes of megaloblastic anemia include medications that interfere with DNA synthesis or with the absorption or metabolism of Vitamin B12 or folate such as methotrexate, sulfasalazine, metformin, anticonvulsant medications (e.g., valproic acid or phenytoin), certain antibiotics (e.g., trimethoprim/sulfamethoxazole), antiretroviral medications, cholestyramine, triamterene,  and nitrous oxide.

Non-Megaloblastic anemias

Red cell membrane disorders producing codocytes
Other disorders which cause macrocytosis without DNA replication problems (i.e., non-megaloblastic macrocytic anemias), are disorders associated with increased red cell membrane surface area, such as pathologies of the liver and spleen which produce codocytes or "target cells" which have a central collection of hemoglobin surrounded by a pallor (a thin area) then followed by a thicker collection of hemoglobin at the rim of the cell.

Alcohol
Round macrocytes which are not codocytes are produced in chronic alcoholism (which produces a mild macrocytosis even in the absence of vitamin deficiency), apparently as a direct toxic effect of alcohol specifically on the bone marrow. Excessive alcohol consumption is one of the most common causes of macrocytosis and non-megaloblastic macrocytic anemia.

Association with rapid red cell turnover and reticulocytosis
Mild macrocytosis is a common finding associated with rapid blood restoration or production, since in general, "fresh" or newly produced red cells (reticulocytes) are larger than the mean (average) size, due to slow shrinkage of normal cells over a normal red cell circulating lifetime. Thus, chronic obstructive pulmonary disease (COPD), in which red cells are rapidly produced in response to low oxygen levels in the blood, often produces mild macrocytosis. The macrocytosis associated with COPD is also attributed to excess cell water secondary to carbon dioxide retention. Also, rapid blood replacement from the marrow after a traumatic blood loss, or rapid red blood cell turnover from rapid hemolysis (G6PD deficiency), also often produces mild macrocytosis in the associated anemia.

Diagnosis
Several tests can help to elucidate the underlying cause of a person's macrocytic anemia. A peripheral blood smear is often recommended as a first step in the evaluation to determine if the macrocytic anemia has megaloblastic features since the causes of megaloblastic and non-megaloblastic macrocytic anemia differ and making this distinction can narrow the list of differential diagnoses. 

For non-megaloblastic macrocytic anemias, a reticulocyte count may be helpful. Non-megaloblastic macrocytic anemias with a low reticulocyte count (indicating a poor bone marrow response to the anemia) suggest liver disease (e.g., cirrhosis), hypothyroidism, toxic effects of alcohol on the bone marrow, or myelodysplasia. In contrast, non-megaloblastic macrocytic anemias associated with a high reticulocyte count (reticulocytosis) may be caused by hemolysis or bleeding.

For megaloblastic macrocytic anemias, useful tests may include serum levels of Vitamin B12, methylmalonic acid, and homocysteine. If there is no clear evidence of Vitamin B12 or folic acid deficiency, additional causes of megaloblastic anemia include copper deficiency, medications, and certain inborn errors of metabolism.

Epidemiology
Macrocytic anemias have several causes but with the implementation of folic acid fortification in North America, folic acid deficiency has become a rare cause of megaloblastic macrocytic anemia in that part of the world. In this region, Vitamin B12 deficiency is a far more common cause of megaloblastic macrocytic anemia. In countries that have not put such practices into place — including most European nations — folic acid deficiency remains a common cause of macrocytic anemia.

See also
 List of circulatory system conditions

References

External links

Anemias